Bernard Foley (born 8 September 1989) is an Australian rugby player of Irish descent. He plays professionally for the Australia national rugby team and  the New South Wales Waratahs in Super Rugby. He can cover both fullback and fly-half as well as inside centre. Foley has earned the nickname "the iceman" after successful game winning penalty goals, 2 August 2014, 18 October 2015.

Foley has had a vast amount of experience in rugby and played at a variety of differing teams and competitions both domestically and internationally. In his early years Foley played rugby sevens for Australia and competed at the 2010 Commonwealth Games where he received a silver medal in the final of the rugby sevens tournament for his services for the team that took place in Delhi, India. Foley has played for the amateur club team Sydney University since 2012, who compete annually in the state-based competition the Shute Shield. During the 2015–16 Japanese Top League season, after his successful season with the Waratahs just a season beforehand, Foley played for Tokyo-based club Ricoh Black Rams. And recently is playing club rugby in the National Rugby Championship for the New South Wales Country Eagles. He has played for the Australian Super Rugby franchise the New South Wales Waratahs since 2011 and Australia since 2013.

Rugby career

Rugby sevens
Foley began his career in sevens in 2009. He was a silver medallist with the Australian sevens team at the 2010 Commonwealth Games, and went on to captain the team on the 2010–11 IRB Sevens World Series circuit. He was awarded the Sydney University Male Blue of the Year in 2011. He was also named the 2011 Australian Sevens Player of the Year.

Waratahs

2014–15

Foley was the first choice fly-half during the 2014 Waratahs season, having cemented his position in the 2012–13 seasons, and only having to compete with two new players, 19-year-old Dave Horwitz, 23-year-old Ben Volavola and edging out former number one fly-half, Kurtley Beale.

Foley opened his 2014 campaign off in round 2 – round 1 was played by the South African conference – by kicking five conversions and one penalty for a combined score of thirteen points. Helping the Waratahs to a smooth six-try bonus point victory (43–21) over the Perth-based Western Force at Allianz Stadium, Sydney.

On the following Saturday, 1 March 2014, Foley played at home against conference rivals, the Queensland Reds. Kicking three conversions and two penalties (12 points), with the Waratahs having won two from two Australian Conference games both at home. Between rounds 5 and 11 Foley scored one try, ten conversions, and sixteen penalty goals (73 points) against the Brumbies, Rebels, Sharks, Stormers, Force, Bulls and the Blues. After eleven rounds the Waratahs were 5–4, with Bernard Foley scoring a total of 98 points.

Following the balanced win loss ratio the Waratahs had before 12, the Waratahs finished the remaining seven games of the regular season unbeaten, with Foley scoring 110 points. On 26 July 2014, the Waratahs played the Brumbies at Allianz Stadium, Sydney, in the Semi-final. Foley kicked one conversion and three penalty goals (11 points), and the Waratahs ran out 26 to 8 winners to host their first ever Super Rugby final. On 2 August 2014, the Waratahs played New Zealand team the Crusaders. In the seventy-ninth minute of the 2014 Super Rugby Final, Foley kicked a 45-metre penalty goal to win the game 33–32 in front of 61,823. Bernard Foley scored a total of 252 points in the 2014 Super Rugby season.

2015 was an unsuccessful season compared with 2014. However, Foley managed five tries in 2015 one short of his successive six the season prior. Foley scored a total of 187 points with the Waratahs winning the Australian conference before going down to the Highlanders in the Semi-finals.

In July 2015, Foley signed a three-year flexible contract with the Australian Rugby Union, becoming the first player to sign such a deal. The contract enabled him to play two seasons of rugby in Japans Top League, whilst remaining eligible to represent Australia.

2016–17
The 2016 season was another unsuccessful season for both Foley and the Waratahs. Foley only registered 1 try, 15 penalty goals and 35 conversions (120 points). The Waratahs finished 2nd in the Australian conference, 6th in the Australasian conference and 10th overall.

2017 was one of the most unsuccessful seasons in Australian Super Rugby history, which also took a toll on both Foley's success on the field and the New South Wales Waratahs. Foley managed to score 3 tries, 12 penalty goals and 31 conversions (113 points) in 2017. The Waratahs finished second last (4th) in the Australian conference, 9th in the Australasian conference, and 16th overall with only the Japanese team the Sunwolves and the Rebels finishing with less points.

2018–19

Foley had an exciting 2018 season following two very disappointing years in 2016 and 2017. Foley played a fundamental role for the Waratahs in 2018, similar to his role in the Waratahs' 2014 campaign.

Foley started off the 2018 campaign on 24 February 2018 against South African team the Stormers. Foley kicked three conversions and two penalty goals for a total score of fourteen points in a 34–17 victory at home. In round 3 of the 2018 Super Rugby season, Foley kicked one penalty goal and three conversions, including a seventy-ninth-minute penalty goal to level the score, in a 24–24 draw with the Sharks of Durban at Kings Park Stadium. Foley had successfully converted ten kicks in a row following this match. The next match Foley converted four of four kicks, including two in the eightieth-minute, in an away match in Buenos Aires. Losing to the Jaguares by ten points.

The Waratahs' first game against an Australian conference team was in round 5 at home against the Rebels. Foley scored twenty-one points from his boot, kicking six conversions and three penalty goals for a twenty-four point victory. Kicking four penalty goals and one conversion to beat the Brumbies by a converted try, 17–24. The following round Foley scored fifteen points after he kicked one penalty goal and six conversions against the Sunwolves in Tokyo. The Waratahs played Australian conference rivals the Queensland Reds at the Sydney Cricket Ground in round 9. Defeating them 37–16, with Foley scoring more points individually than the opposing team.

In rounds 10, 12 and 13 Foley scored only fifteen points. Foley kicked six conversions and one penalty goal between those rounds. In round 14 Foley converted four of the six tries scored against the Highlanders and kicked one penalty goal to score eleven points in a 41–12 victory over the New Zealand side at home. Leading towards the Super Rugby finals, the Waratahs won three and lost two with Foley scoring fifty seven points. Kicking twenty-four conversions, five penalty goals and scoring one try in the process. In the Super Rugby Qualifying final, Foley played an important role in the Waratahs' hopes of winning. Foley kicked two penalty goals before the tenth minute before the Highlanders scored two converted tries and also had three penalty goals to add. Losing 6–23 at half-time, Foley went on to score two tries, which he converted, before the end of the game. Foley scored a season game high of twenty-five points. The Waratahs won 30–23 at home. The Waratahs lost 44–26 to finish the 2018 season. Foley finished the season confidently as he finished top scorer in the competition with 223 points.

Foley started the 2019 season in round 1 against the Hurricanes at Brookvale Oval, Sydney. Foley scored a conversion kick in the 44th minute, after a try from Waratahs centre Curtis Rona, and four penalty goals in the 3rd, 12th, 16th and 40th minute. However, Foley missed a penalty goal late in the game. The Waratahs lost 19–20. Round 2, the Waratahs played against the Sunwolves in Tokyo. Foley kicked two conversions, missing two in a windy match. The Waratahs won by one point (30–31). After a round 3 bye, Foley played against rivals the Queensland Reds at the Sydney Cricket Ground, Sydney. Foley kicked three penalty goals and converted two out of three tries scored in an eleven-point victory.

Japan

Kubota Spears

It was confirmed by the Waratahs that Foley would be leaving the club to stay in Japan post World Cup to play club rugby with the Kubota Spears. This was Foley's second spell in Japan, previously playing for the Ricoh Black Rams in 2015/16.

International career

2013–present
In July 2013, Michael Cheika, the former New South Wales Waratahs coach, announced that he would send a 34-man New South Wales Barbarians squad to Argentina to take on the Pumas in a two-match series, with Foley being named in the squad. On 3 August 2013, the Barbarians lost 29–27 in La Plata, Buenos Aires to Argentina. Foley kicked one penalty goal in the seventy-seventh minute.

Foley made his debut on 5 October 2013 against Argentina in the final match of the 2013 Rugby Championship. Foley come off the bench in the 65th minute replacing Quade Cooper. He played less than fifteen minutes before scoring his first international try in a seven-try victory in Rosario, Argentina under head coach Ewen McKenzie.

Foley's first start as a fly-half for Australia was on 7 June 2014 against France during the France tour of Australia at Suncorp Stadium, Brisbane. Foley started all three games at fly-half and scored a total of thirty-two points (ten conversions, four penalty goals).

Rugby World Cup

2015

The 2015 Rugby World Cup was a very successful showing for Foley. He showed his creativity as well as his awareness and vision on the field. His link up play as a number ten with the other players around him showed just how important he was to the Wallabies and his ability to stay calm during the big moments throughout 2015.

This was Foley's first Rugby World Cup campaign with Australia. Foley made his debut in the Rugby World Cup against Fiji on 23 September in Cardiff. He kicked two of the three tries scored and three penalty goals. Australia beat Fiji 28–13. Foley's second game in his first Rugby World Cup campaign came against England and was one of his best performances on the international stage. Foley scored twenty-eight points alone (two tries, three conversions, and four penalty goals) compared with England's thirteen. Australia ran out 13–33 winners at Twickenham, knocking England out of the World Cup and sending themselves and Wales through to the quarterfinals. On 10 October, he was once again instrumental in Australia's progression, scoring all 15 points against Wales, in a 15–6 victory and progressed to the quarterfinals having won Pool A. Foley's role against Scotland in the quarterfinals was critical, however, Foley's conversion rate was far from critical, having missed three of five conversions. Foley managed to kick over an eighty-minute penalty goal to win the game for Australia in the wet conditions and send them through to the semifinals.

Towards the latter end of the tournament, specifically in the knockout stage, Foley's influence on the team was less and less meaningful. Foley's most influential and impactful duty is scoring, and Foley was scoring less than earlier in the tournament. On 25 October, against Argentina, Foley scored the second-lowest number of points he had scored all tournament with nine. However, Australia kept Argentina try-less throughout the game and won 15–29 to reach the final.

In the Final of the Rugby World Cup, Foley scored seven points, the lowest total of points in one game for the fly-half during the 2015 campaign. Despite only kicking two conversions and one penalty goal against the number one ranked team in the world, Foley finished equal third top point scorer with man of the match, Dan Carter. Foley finished the tournament with 82 points. Australia were defeated in the final 34–17.

2019

In the lead up to the Rugby World Cup in September, Foley played a total of 160 minutes of rugby for the Wallabies: eighty minutes against South Africa, eighty minutes against Samoa. Although playing impressive rugby against South Africa, Foley did not play again in the 2019 Rugby Championship, Christian Lealiifano being the preferred fly-half.

In August, Foley was announced to be in the 31-man Wallabies squad to play at the World Cup. Foley's first and only match of the Rugby World Cup came against Wales, in what was touted as the pool decider. Foley was replaced just after half-time (45'), replaced by Matt To'omua. Australia lost by four points (25–29). Foley and teammates alike, specifically the scrum-half, Will Genia, were heavily criticised after the game for their poor performance, contributing to the loss. It was Australia's first loss to Wales in a Rugby World Cup since the inaugural World Cup in 1987. Foley scored three points at the 2019 Rugby World Cup.

Super Rugby statistics

Honours
Australia

Rugby World Cup / Webb Ellis Cup
Runner-up: 2015
The Rugby Championship
Winner: 2015
Runner-up: 2016, 2017

James Bevan Trophy
Winner: 2014, 2016, 2017
Mandela Challenge Plate
Winner: 2015, 2016, 2017, 2018
Puma Trophy
Winner: 2015, 2016, 2017, 2018

Hopetoun Cup
Winner: 2016
Killik Cup
Winner: 2014

New South Wales
Super Rugby
Winner: 2014
Australian Conference winner: 2014, 2015, 2018

Personal life
Foley was born in Sydney, New South Wales in 1989 to Michael Foley, a lawyer. Foley's father's side of the family is Irish, originating from Cork, Ireland. Foley's brother, Conor, plays as a running back for the Australia national American football team.

References

External links
 Wallabies Profile 
 Kubota Spears profile
 
 
 

1989 births
Australian rugby union players
Australia international rugby union players
Male rugby sevens players
New South Wales Waratahs players
Rugby union fullbacks
Rugby union fly-halves
Rugby union players from Sydney
People educated at St Aloysius' College (Sydney)
Living people
Australia international rugby sevens players
Australian people of Irish descent
Black Rams Tokyo players
Australian expatriate rugby union players
Australian expatriate sportspeople in Japan
Expatriate rugby union players in Japan
Commonwealth Games medallists in rugby sevens
Commonwealth Games silver medallists for Australia
Rugby sevens players at the 2010 Commonwealth Games
Commonwealth Games rugby sevens players of Australia
Kubota Spears Funabashi Tokyo Bay players
Sydney Stars players
New South Wales Country Eagles players
Medallists at the 2010 Commonwealth Games